Liga Deportiva Universitaria de Quito's 2007 season was the club's 77th year of existence, the 54th year in professional football, and the 46th in the top level of professional football in Ecuador.

Club
Coaching staff
Manager: Edgardo Bauza
Assistant manager: José Daniel Di Leo
Physical trainer: Bruno Militano
Goalkeeper trainer: Óscar Manis
Kits
Supplier: Umbro
Sponsor(s): Movistar, Coca-Cola, Pilsener

Squad

Competitions

|}

Serie A

First stage
2007 was the club's 46th season in the top-flight national tournament. The first stage was played between February 1, 2007 and June 13, 2007.

Second stage
The second stage was played between July 15, 2007, and October 7, 2007.

Liguilla Final
The Liguilla Final was played between October 21, 2007 and December 16, 2007.

Copa Libertadores

Copa Libertadores Squad

First stage

LDU Quito advanced on points 4–1.

Second stage

References
RSSSF - 2007 Serie A

External links
Official website 
Emelec (4) - LDU Quito (3) 1st goal
LDU Quito (2) - El Nacional (0)

2007
Ldu